Csilla von Boeselager (May 17, 1941 in Budapest – February 23, 1994, in Arnsberg-Voßwinkel) was a Baroness who founded the Hungarian Maltese Charity Organisation in Germany, and initiated the foundation of the Magyar Máltai Szeretetszolgálat (MMSz) in Hungary. She was a Dame of Malta.

Biography
She was born Csilla Fényes de Dengelegh, in a Hungarian noble family. Her father was the engineer dr. Ivan Fényes de Dengelegh, and her mother was Marianna Zrobay de Zboró. After World War II she and her family escaped to Venezuela, South America from Hungary.  

She graduated from Vassar College, Poughkeepsie, New York, USA, in 1961, with a major in chemistry.  Following graduation, she worked at American Cyanamid in Connecticut marketing for a German chemical company.

After moving to Germany, she married the Baron Wolfhard von Boeselager.  

In August 1989 Csilla von Boeselager spontaneously proposed that the German Government care for thousands of refugees from the German Democratic Republic (GDR) in Budapest. The refugee-camps were in Zugliget and Csillebérc.

She was active in the Malteser Hilfsdienst (MHD) from 1982 until her death at age 52 in 1994. Since her death her work is continued in the foundation "Csilla von Boeselager Stiftung - Osteuropahilfe", which brings help to six countries in Eastern Europe (Hungary, Serbia, Romania, Poland and Ukraine). www.boeselager-osteuropahilfe.de

Her sister, Ildikó Fényes is the president of the Federation of Latin American Hungarian Organizations (Latin-amerikai Magyar Szervezetek Országos Szövetsége), and has lived in Venezuela since the end of the Second World War.

1941 births
Nobility from Budapest
Hungarian Roman Catholics
Csilla
German baronesses
German people of Hungarian descent
Dames of Malta
1994 deaths